Cheilopogon atrisignis is a species of fish in the family Exocoetidae, first described in 1903 by Oliver Peebles Jenkins as Cypselurus atrisignis.

It is a tropical, pelagic flying fish, found at depths of 0 - 10 m,  able to  leap from the water and glide considerable distances.

References

External links
 Cheilopogon atrisignis occurrence data from GBIF

Beloniformes
Fish described in 1903
Taxa named by Oliver Peebles Jenkins